Phoeniciloricus is a monospecific genus of loriciferans, a phylum of small marine sediment-dwelling animals. Its one species is Phoeniciloricus simplidigitatus.

References

Loricifera
Monotypic protostome genera